Michael Norman Royston Ashfold FRS is a British chemist and  Professor of Physical Chemistry at University of Bristol.
He is a 2011 Royal Society Leverhulme Trust Senior Research Fellow.

He graduated B.Sc in 1975 and Ph.D in 1978 from Birmingham University.

His fields of research include ultraviolet photochemistry, optical diagnostic methods implemented on microwave-activated methane/hydrogen plasmas in the context of diamond growth via chemical vapour deposition, diamond thin film investigations and the study of nanostructured thin films.

Awards
1989 Corday–Morgan Medal of the Royal Society of Chemistry
1996 Tilden Prize of the Royal Society of Chemistry
2009 Elected Fellow of the Royal Society

References

British chemists
Fellows of the Royal Society
Academics of the University of Bristol
Living people
Year of birth missing (living people)